Isolationism is a political philosophy advocating a national foreign policy that opposes involvement in the political affairs, and especially the wars, of other countries. Thus, isolationism fundamentally advocates neutrality and opposes entanglement in military alliances and mutual defense pacts. In its purest form, isolationism opposes all commitments to foreign countries including treaties and trade agreements. This distinguishes isolationism from non-interventionism, which also advocates military neutrality but does not necessarily oppose international commitments and treaties in general.

This contrasts with philosophies such as colonialism, expansionism, and liberal internationalism.

Introduction
Isolationism has been defined as:

By country

Albania

Bhutan
Before 1999, Bhutan had banned television and the Internet in order to preserve its culture, environment, and identity. Eventually, Jigme Singye Wangchuck lifted the ban on television and the Internet. His son, Jigme Khesar Namgyel Wangchuck, was elected Druk Gyalpo of Bhutan, which helped forge the Bhutanese democracy. Bhutan has subsequently undergone a transition from an absolute monarchy to a constitutional monarchy multi-party democracy. The development of Bhutanese democracy has been marked by the active encouragement and participation of the reigning Bhutanese monarchs since the 1950s, beginning with legal reforms, and culminating in the enactment of Bhutan's Constitution.

Cambodia

From 1431 to 1863, the Kingdom of Cambodia enforced an isolationist policy. The policy prohibited foreign contact with most outside countries. When Pol Pot and the Khmer Rouge came to power on 17 April 1975 and established Democratic Kampuchea, The whole population of Cambodia were evacuated in every cities including Phnom Penh to the countryside that was ordered by Communist Party of Kampuchea and the secret police Santebal have established an infamous prison gulag inside the torture chamber called Tuol Sleng (S-21). Cambodia became Year Zero because of its extreme isolation from the rest of the world but not before 1979 when the Vietnamese overthrow Pol Pot and the Khmer Rouge and liberated Cambodia from tyranny on 7 January.

China

After Zheng He's voyages in the 15th century, the foreign policy of the Ming dynasty in China became increasingly isolationist. The Hongwu Emperor was not the first to propose the policy to ban all maritime shipping in 1390. The Qing dynasty that came after the Ming dynasty often continued the Ming dynasty's isolationist policies. Wokou, which literally translates to "Japanese pirates" or "dwarf pirates", were pirates who raided the coastlines of China, Japan, and Korea, and were one of the key primary concerns, although the maritime ban was not without some control.

In the winter of 1757, the Qianlong Emperor declared that—effective the next year—Guangzhou was to be the only Chinese port permitted to foreign traders, beginning the Canton System.

Since the division of the territory following the Chinese Civil War in 1949, China is divided into two regimes with the People's Republic of China solidified control on mainland China while the existing Republic of China was confined to the island of Taiwan as both governments lay claim to each other's sovereignty. While the PRC is recognized by the United Nations, European Union, and the majority of the world's states, the ROC remains diplomatically isolated although 15 states recognize it as "China" with some countries maintaining unofficial diplomatic relations through trade offices.

Japan

From 1641 to 1853, the Tokugawa shogunate of Japan enforced a policy called kaikin. The policy prohibited foreign contact with most outside countries. The commonly held idea that Japan was entirely closed, however, is misleading. In fact, Japan maintained limited-scale trade and diplomatic relations with China, Korea, and the Ryukyu Islands, as well as the Dutch Republic as the only Western trading partner of Japan for much of the period.

The culture of Japan developed with limited influence from the outside world and had one of the longest stretches of peace in history. During this period, Japan developed thriving cities, castle towns, increasing commodification of agriculture and domestic trade, wage labor, increasing literacy and concomitant print culture, laying the groundwork for modernization even as the shogunate itself grew weak.

Korea

In 1863, Emperor Gojong took the throne of the Joseon Dynasty when he was a child. His father, Regent Heungseon Daewongun, ruled for him until Gojong reached adulthood. During the mid-1860s he was the main proponent of isolationism and the principal instrument of the persecution of both native and foreign Catholics.

Following the division of the peninsula after independence from Japan in 1945–48, Kim Il-sung inaugurated an isolationist nationalist regime in the North, which has been continued by his son and grandson following his death in 1994.

Paraguay

In 1814, three years after it gained its independence on May 14, 1811, Paraguay was taken over by the dictator José Gaspar Rodríguez de Francia. During his rule which lasted from 1814 until his death in 1840, he closed Paraguay's borders and prohibited trade or any relationship between Paraguay and the outside world. The Spanish settlers who had arrived in Paraguay just before it gained its independence were required to marry old colonists or the native Guaraní in order to create a single Paraguayan people.

Francia had a particular dislike of foreigners, and those foreigners who came to Paraguay during his rule, which was very difficult, were not allowed to leave the country for the rest of their lives. An independent character, he hated European influences and the Catholic Church and in order to try to keep foreigners at bay, he turned church courtyards into artillery parks and turned confession boxes into border sentry posts.

United States

The cultural roots of isolationism, such as German and Irish ethnicity, have interested scholars.
Some scholars, such as Robert J. Art, believe that the United States had an isolationist history, but other scholars dispute that claim by describing the United States as following a strategy of unilateralism or non-interventionism rather than a strategy of isolationism. Robert Art makes his argument in A Grand Strategy for America (2003). Books that have made the argument that the United States followed unilaterism instead of isolationism include Walter A. McDougall's Promised Land, Crusader State (1997), John Lewis Gaddis's Surprise, Security, and the American Experience (2004), and Bradley F. Podliska's Acting Alone (2010). Both sides claim policy prescriptions from George Washington's Farewell Address as evidence for their argument. Bear F. Braumoeller argues that even the best case for isolationism, the United States in the interwar period, has been widely misunderstood and that Americans proved willing to fight as soon as they believed a genuine threat existed.
Warren F. Kuehl and Gary B. Ostrower argue:
Events during and after the Revolution related to the treaty of alliance with France, as well as difficulties arising over the neutrality policy pursued during the French revolutionary wars and the Napoleonic wars, encouraged another perspective. A desire for separateness and unilateral freedom of action merged with national pride and a sense of continental safety to foster the policy of isolation. Although the United States maintained diplomatic relations and economic contacts abroad, it sought to restrict these as narrowly as possible in order to retain its independence. The Department of State continually rejected proposals for joint cooperation, a policy made explicit in the Monroe Doctrine's emphasis on unilateral action. Not until 1863 did an American delegate attend an international conference.

Criticism
Isolationism has been criticized for the lack of aiding nations with major troubles. One notable example is that of American isolationism, which Benjamin Schwartz described as a "tragedy" inspired by Puritanism.

See also

 Autarky
 Cordon Sanitaire
 Economic nationalism
 Imperium
 Iron Curtain
 Indigenous peoples in voluntary isolation
 International isolation
 Monroe Doctrine
 Non-interventionism
 Sakoku
 Swiss neutrality
 Isolation (disambiguation)
 Splendid isolation
 United States non-interventionism
 Unilateralism in the United States

Works cited

References
 Barry, Tom. "A Global Affairs Commentary: The Terms of Power," Foreign Policy in Focus, November 6, 2002, University Press.
 Berry, Mary Elizabeth. (2006). Japan in Print: Information and Nation in the Early Modern Period. Berkeley: University of California Press. ; 
Chalberg, John C. (1995). Isolationism: Opposing Viewpoints. San Diego: Greenhaven Press. ; 
 Craig, Albert. (1961). Chōshū in the Meiji Restoration. Cambridge: Harvard University Press. ; 
 Glahn, Richard Von. (1996). Fountain of Fortune: Money and Monetary Policy in China, 1000–1700. Berkeley: University of California Press. ; 
 Graebner, Norman A. (1956). The New Isolationism; a Study in Politics and Foreign Policy Since 1950. New York: Ronald Press. 
 Jansen, Marius B. (1961). Sakamoto Ryoma and the Meiji Restoration. Princeton: Princeton University Press. 
 Nichols, Christopher McKnight (2011). "Promise and Peril: America at the Dawn of a Global Age." Cambridge, Massachusetts: Harvard University Press, 2011. 
 Nordlinger, Eric A. (1995). Isolationism Reconfigured: American Foreign Policy for a New Century. Princeton: Princeton University Press. ; 
 Smith, Thomas C. (1959). The Agrarian Origins of Modern Japan. Stanford: Stanford University Press. 
 Sullivan, Michael P. "Isolationism." World Book Deluxe 2001. CD-ROM.
 Toby, Ronald P. (1984). State and Diplomacy in Early Modern Japan: Asia in the Development of the Tokugawa Bakufu. Princeton: Princeton University Press. ; 

Washington, George "Washington's Farewell Address 1796." Yale Law School Avalon Project, 2008. Web. 12 Sept 2013.

Isolationism
International relations theory